Lohar Deo is a mountain of the Garhwal Himalaya in Uttarakhand, India. It is situated in the eastern rim of Nanda Devi Sanctuary on the watershed of Milam Glacier and Nanda Devi basin. It is joint 133rd highest located entirely within the Uttrakhand. Nanda Devi, is the highest mountain in this category. Lohar Deo situated between Sakram in the south west and Bamchu on the north west. It lies 1.2 km NNE of Sakram . Its nearest higher neighbor Deo Damla  lies 2.6 km NW . Bamchu  lies 1.8 km NW and it is 9.9 km NE of Nanda Devi . It lies 11.6 km SE of Kalanka .

Neighboring and subsidiary peaks
Neighboring or subsidiary peaks of Lohar Deo:
 Nanda Devi: 
 Rishi Pahar: 
 Bamchu: 
 Sakram 
 Rishi Kot: 
 Changabang: 
 Kalanka: 
 Saf Minal:

Glaciers and rivers
It stands between two glacier Bamchu Glacier and Sakram Glacier on the western side.  Both the glacier flows down from west to east and joins Milam Glacier. Further down south east from the snout of Milam glacier emerges Goriganga River that later joins the Kali River at Jauljibi. On the western side Uttari Nanda Devi Glacier flows down north and joins Uttari Rishi Glacier from the snout of Uttari Rishi Glacier emerges Rish Ganga. Rishi Ganga met with Dhauliganga River near Rini. Later Dhauli ganga met with Alaknanda at Vishnuprayag. Alaknanda River is one of the main tributaries of river Ganga that later joins Bhagirathi River the other main tributaries of river Ganga at Devprayag and became Ganga there after.

See also

 List of Himalayan peaks of Uttarakhand

References

Mountains of Uttarakhand
Six-thousanders of the Himalayas
Geography of Chamoli district